Belle Glade State Municipal Airport  is a public-use airport located  northeast of the central business district of the city of Belle Glade in Palm Beach County, Florida, United States. The airport is publicly owned.

References

External links

Airports in Palm Beach County, Florida